Allen Plays Allen is an album by television host, Steve Allen. Allen played piano on a set of 12 of his own compositions with backing from a small rhythm combo. The album was released in 1956 on Coral Records (catalog no. CRL-57047). 
Upon its release, Billboard wrote that Allen displayed his talent as a pianist with backing by celeste, guitar, bass, and drums, in album that "makes for pleasant listening." AllMusic gave the album a rating of three stars. Reviewer Greg Adams called it "a serious collection of melodies performed fluidly and competently by Allen with few eccentric touches."

Track listing 
Side A
 "The Girl in the Grey Flannel Suit"
 "Love Is Young"
 "Fools"
 "Magic Star"
 "I Never Should Have Told You	"
 "With You"

Side B
 "What Is a Freem?"
 "That I Don't Love You"
 "Do You Remember Me?"
 "All Life Through"
 "What Is a Woman"
 "Can I Wait Up for Santa Claus?"

References

Steve Allen albums
1956 albums
Coral Records albums